The Honda HR-414E and Honda HR-420E are prototype, four-stroke 2.0-litre single-turbocharged inline-4 racing engine, developed and produced by Honda for the Super GT series. The HR-420E engine is fully custom-built.

Applications
Dallara SF14
Dallara SF19
Honda NSX-GT

References

Engines by model
Gasoline engines by model
Honda engines
Four-cylinder engines
Straight-four engines
Honda in motorsport